The western gecko (Ancylodactylus occidentalis) is a species of gecko found in Guinea, Sierra Leone, and Ivory Coast.

References

Ancylodactylus
Reptiles described in 1943